Kruglovsky is a rural locality (a settlement) in Ostrovskoye Rural Settlement, Anninsky District, Voronezh Oblast, Russia. The population was 145 as of 2010. There are 3 streets.

Geography 
Kruglovsky is located 48 km east of Anna (the district's administrative centre) by road. Arkhangelskoye is the nearest rural locality.

References 

Rural localities in Anninsky District